Edmur Pinto Ribeiro (Saquarema, 9 September 1929 – Niterói, 25 September 2007) was a Brazilian professional football player and manager.

Playing career
During his career, he played for clubs in Venezuela, Brazil, Portugal and Spain. In the season of 1959-60 of the Portuguese championship he was the best scorer, with 25 goals on the service of Vitória de Guimarães. Edmur made 14 league appearances for Celta de Vigo during the 1961–62 Segunda División season.

Edmur made one appearance for the Brazil national football team, a friendly international against Paraguay on 17 November 1955.

Career as a manager
After he retired from playing, Edmur became a football manager in Portugal.

References

External links
 Profile at sitadelusa.com
 

1929 births
2007 deaths
Brazilian footballers
Brazil international footballers
Brazilian football managers
CR Flamengo footballers
CR Vasco da Gama players
Associação Portuguesa de Desportos players
Clube Náutico Capibaribe players
Vitória S.C. players
Leixões S.C. players
RC Celta de Vigo players
Association football forwards
Sportspeople from Rio de Janeiro (state)
Deportivo Miranda F.C. managers
People from Saquarema